Anna Potocka may refer to:

 Anna Potocka, wife of Aleksander Dominik Kazanowski (1605–1648)
 Princess Anna Teresa Potocka née Ossolińska (1746–1810), Polish noblewoman
 Anna Tyszkiewicz (1779–1867), Polish noblewoman and diarist, married Aleksander Stanisław Potocki in 1805